The 2022 Formula Regional Americas Championship powered by Honda was the fifth season of a FIA-sanctioned F3 series across North America, and the third season under the Formula Regional moniker after a rebrand in 2020. The series was promoted by SCCA Pro Racing, the professional racing division of the Sports Car Club of America. Drivers competed to win a Honda-backed Super Formula seat in 2023.

After not racing for two full years, Raoul Hyman won the drivers' championship with two races to spare. His team, TJ Speed Motorsports, defended the teams' championship title.

Teams and drivers 
All drivers competed with Honda-powered Ligier JS F3 cars on Hankook tires.

 Alliance Racing was planning to enter the championship, but those plans did not come to fruition.

Race calendar and results 
The 2022 calendar was announced on 23 September 2021. Each round featured three races. A pre-season invitational non-points event was scheduled to be held on 24-27 March at Road Atlanta. After a round in Canada was attempted to be held for the last two years, but was cancelled both times, the 2022 schedule once again only consisted of races inside the US.

Season summary 
The championship began in early April at NOLA Motorsports Park with Raoul Hyman topping the qualifying session on his return to single seater racing. Mac Clark started alongside him for race one, and was faster off the line to take the race lead. Hyman put pressure on Clark at different points throughout the race, but was not able to make a pass. Dylan Tavella completed the podium, more than 25 seconds behind. Hyman fared better in race two, converting pole to victory. Behind him, Clark and Tavella fought for second place, with Tavella eventually coming through. The third race saw Hyman once again lose his lead at the start. This time, he slipped back to third, behind eventual race winner Tavella and Jason Alder. Hyman and Tavella left Avondale equal on points, with Clark eight points behind in third.

Round two of the season was held at Road America, and Hyman was on pole again by almost a second. Nico Christodoulou started second, but stalled at the start of race one and Hayden Bowlsbey crashed into him. This promoted Tavella into second place, and Ryan Yardley completed the podium after battling past Alder and Clark. Race two saw Hyman hold his lead once again, while behind him Alder, Clark and Tavella fought for second. Hyman then spun with two laps to go, gifting Alder the win but still finishing second ahead of Tavella. Hyman recovered to dominate race three. Christodoulou in second went off while battling Tavella, and Alder and Nick Persing then came through to round out the podium. Hyman's strong weekend saw him pick up the championship lead, 23 points ahead of his nearest challenger Tavella.

Next up was Lexington's Mid-Ohio Sports Car Course, and Hyman continued his pole position streak. He and Alder kept first and second place in race one until a late caution bunched the grid back up. This enabled Persing to get past Alder for second, but Hyman could not be stopped. Race two saw a similar domination by Hyman, this time against Clark in second with Persing gaining to positions to finish third. Damp conditions saw eight drivers start race three on wet tyres. Hyman among them was in a league of his own, putting 51 seconds between him and the rest of the field. Slick tyres came into play when the track dried up, and Clark went on a charge, before it started to rain again and he went off. Tavella and Cooper Becklin came second and third. His perfect weekend with a pole and three wins saw Hyman extend his championship lead to 58 points.

Teams and drivers then headed to New Jersey Motorsports Park, where qualifying was once again topped by Hyman. The first race was a simple affair for the poleman as he lapped all bar the top eight drivers. Tavella moved past Yardley at the start and the pair finished second and third. Race two proved more challenging for Hyman, as his charge was interrupted by two caution periods, so Tavella was able to keep close behind him and then pass him for the race win on the last lap. Yardley came third again. Tavella started race three from pole, and fought Hyman off in a close battle that lasted until the final lap, as the pair crossed the line 0.089s apart. The only driver that managed to stick with the duo was Persing in third place. Tavella's two wins meant he outscored Hyman, slightly cutting down his lead to 51 points.

The penultimate round of the season at Virginia International Raceway began with the now familiar sight of Hyman on pole position for race one. At the start, Persing and Alder fought for second, with Persing locking up into turn one, colliding with Hyman and spinning him around. This promoted Alder into the lead, and Hyman had to climb through the order. He did so, only to hit the barriers on the penultimate lap. Alder won the race ahead of Yardley and Tavella. Race two and three were two rather simple lights-to-flag affairs for Hyman. He kept Alder and Tavella at bay in race two and defended against Tavella in race three, before the latter had to pit with an issue. That promoted Yardley into second, before he got overtaken by Becklin. With 75 points on offer at Austin, Hyman had one hand on the championship with his 70-point lead.

Hyman completed his perfect qualifying record with a sixth pole at Circuit of the Americas, this time by over a second. Tavella was able to overtake him on the opening lap of race one, but Hyman was able to take back the lead on lap 13. Tavella came second ahead of Yardley as Hyman claimed the championship title. The second race saw a similar story in reverse, this time Hyman picked up the lead from Alder at the start, but was later repassed when he had a mechanical issue that forced his retirement. The podium for race two was completed by Persing and Tavella. The last race of the season saw Hyman claim his eleventh win of the season in a lights-to-flag race. Oliver Westling came second in only his second weekend in the category, and Yardley rounded out the top three.

Hyman topped every qualifying session and won eleven of the eighteen races, and all his race finishes were on the podium. This utter domination showed Hyman had not lost his pedigree after not racing for two seasons. On the other hand, it also showed the slight lack of competition the series had to struggle with this season, with a field that lacked depth and was spread out very far at times. It remains to be seen if the series will be able to hold its own as an FIA-sanctioned alternative to the Road to Indy.

Championship standings 
Points were awarded as follows:

Drivers' standings

Teams' standings 
Only a team's two best-finishing cars were eligible for teams' championship points.

References

External links 

 Official website: 

Formula Regional Americas Championship
FRAC
FRAC
FRAC